ODP may refer to:

Computing 
 Observer Design Pattern, a software design pattern
 On Device Portal, a mobile application as service portal or content portal
 Open Directory Project, a Web directory; later renamed to DMOZ
 OpenDocument Presentation, a standard mobile electronic office documents file format with file extension 
 OpenDataPlane, a set of application programming interfaces for the networking data plane

Political parties 
 Ökologisch-Demokratische Partei (Ecological Democratic Party), a German political party 
 Özgürlük ve Dayanışma Partisi (Freedom and Solidarity Party), a Turkish political party
 Oromo Democratic Party, a political party in Ethiopia

Companies 
 Office Depot, retail chain of office-supply stores in the United States; stock symbol (ODP)
 Opening Day Partners, company that owns and operates various professional baseball teams in the United States

Other 
 Obstacle departure procedures, IFR standard instrument departure procedures in aviation for obstacle clearance
 Ocean Drilling Program, an international research project
 Omega Delta Phi, multicultural fraternity founded in the United States in 1987
 Operating department practitioner, a person who plans and coordinates perioperative care in a department of a hospital in the United Kingdom
 Orderly Departure Program, a program to resettle Vietnamese refugees in the United States
 Ozone depletion potential in chemistry and pollution
 Olfactory detection port, any part analytical device that uses olfaction as a part of its analysis.

See also
 ÖDP (disambiguation)
 RM-ODP, reference model of open distributed processing